Maria do Amaral Ribeiro (born 9 November 1975) is a Brazilian actress, screenwriter and film director.

Biography 

She worked in soap operas such as A Escrava Isaura, playing the beautiful Malvina, and also Luz do Sol, playing Zoé. She also had a part in the film Tolerância, directed by the gaúcho Carlos Gerbase, playing the young Anamaria.

In 2014, she returned to Globo, in the 9pm soap opera Empire. The following year, she released her first book titled Twenty-Eight and a Half, bringing together "chronicles, reflections and venting" with autobiographical texts.

Personal life 
She had a son with ex-husband Paulo Betti, João, born in 2003. She was married to the actor Caio Blat, a union that brought her second son, Bento, born in 2010. In 2015, the couple separated, but soon after reunited. In 2017, the ten-year marriage came to an end.

She has stated that she is bisexual.

Career

In television

In films

References

External links 

1975 births
Living people
Actresses from Rio de Janeiro (city)
Brazilian telenovela actresses
Brazilian film actresses
Brazilian stage actresses
Bisexual actresses
Brazilian LGBT actors
Brazilian feminists
Brazilian bisexual people